The Bayer designation ζ Librae, Latinised as Zeta Librae (abbreviated ζ Lib / Zeta Lib) is shared by several star systems in the constellation Libra. Sources differ about the Flamsteed and Bayer designations that should be applied to four stars:

HD 137744 (HR 5743), known as ζ1 and 32 Librae
HD 137949 (GZ Librae), sometimes known as 33 Librae, or as ζ2 Librae and 34 Librae
HD 138137 (HR 5750), known as ζ3 and 34 Librae
HD 138485 (HR 5764), known as ζ4 and 35 Librae, often simply called ζ Librae

In light of the obvious confusion, the Bright Star Catalogue recommends the use of HR designations to unambiguously identify these four stars. HD 137949 does not have an HR number although it is included in the Bright Star Catalogue Supplement.

References

Librae, zeta
Libra (constellation)